Famous Dave's of America is a chain of barbecue restaurants primarily located in the Midwestern United States, serving pork ribs, chicken, beef brisket, and several flavors of barbecue sauce.  Dave Anderson, an Ojibwe-Choctaw who served as the head of the federal Bureau of Indian Affairs from 2004 to 2005, started the first Famous Dave's restaurant near Hayward, Wisconsin in 1994. The restaurant chain grew throughout the United States and Puerto Rico in 2014, though all of Famous Dave's Puerto Rico locations closed after Hurricane Maria. It has 180 locations in 33 U.S. states as of 2021 and four international locations, in Winnipeg, Abu Dhabi, Al Ain, and Dubai.

History 

The first restaurant of the chain was Famous Dave's Bar-B-Que in Hayward, Wisconsin. On the morning of November 3, 2014, it was destroyed by fire. The second location opened in the Linden Hills neighborhood of Minneapolis, Minnesota in 1995 and was designed to be an old-fashioned "roadside BBQ Shack". It closed in 2014. The third location opened in 1996 in the Calhoun Square development in Uptown Minneapolis and was designed as a Blues club, Famous Dave's BBQ & Blues. It closed in 2019. A "Lodge" format opened in Minnetonka, Minnesota and the first franchise-operated restaurant opened in Burnsville, Minnesota.

Dave Anderson 

In 1986, Anderson earned a master's degree in Public Administration from Harvard University, without earning an undergraduate degree.

In 1994, he was one of the first investors in Rainforest Café, a theme restaurant chain, and in October 1994, Dave Anderson opened the first Famous Dave's in Hayward, Wisconsin.  Two years after opening in Hayward, the company went public in 1996. Anderson stated on Facebook that the IPO was "the worst decision of his life". Anderson was Famous Dave's CEO until 1997, but remained chairman of the company's board until 2003.

See also 
 List of barbecue restaurants

References

External links 
 

Barbecue restaurants in the United States
Companies based in Minnetonka, Minnesota
Restaurants established in 1994
Restaurant chains in the United States
Companies listed on the Nasdaq
1994 establishments in Wisconsin
1997 initial public offerings